Iron Fist is an Indian Air Force exercise held at Pokhran, Rajasthan. It has been held twice: 2013 and 2016.

Iron Fist 2013
The Iron Fist 2013 was the Indian Air Force's first day-night exercise. It was conducted on 22 February 2013 at the Pokhran firing range. The main objective was to display network-centric operations capabilities of the Indian Air Force. More than 100 aircraft (equal number of aircraft were at standby) and 30 different weapon platforms participated. Along with aircraft, National Security Guard and Garud commandos displayed their tactical skills. The final day of the exercises saw several dignitaries arrive to see a demonstration of capabilities including President of India, Prime Minister, Defence Minister, Chief Minister of Rajasthan, Chief of Indian Navy and several more. A four-hour live telecast of the event was broadcast by Doordarshan National.

Live telecast
The live telecast was an attempt by the IAF to showcase its capabilities. It was accompanied by music and live commentary describing the aircraft, capabilities, mission under progress, target, weapon details, pilot and crew names and also live footage from the cockpit.

The live telecast was divided into four phases.
 Phase 1: Flypast
The flypast was done with several aircraft to start the events of live exercise. It consisted of the following displays:
 3 Mi-8 helicopters with the tricolor
 MiG-27 flying at 450 km/hour with Iron Fist 13 banner in tow
 Jaguar showing live footage of the main spectator stand from aircraft cameras
 Rejuvenated Tiger Moth
 Pilatus PC-7 Mk2 aerobics
 MiG-29 (Supersonic flypast)
 All 5 variants of MiG-21 in service with IAF in an Arrowhead formation
 5 Jaguar aircraft in Arrowhead formation
 5 Upgraded MiG-27 in Arrowhead formation
 5 MiG-29 in Arrowhead formation
 Formation flight of Jaguar, MiG-21 Bison and MiG-27
 3 Su-30 MKI in Vic formation
 HAL Cheetah + HAL Chetak + HAL Dhruv + HAL LCH
 Aerobatics by HAL LCH
 Phase-2: Offensive capabilities
The Exercise showcased offensive operations like destroying communication centers, runways, hangars, fuel & ammunition buildings, etc. deep behind enemy lines.
Major Offensive demonstrations:
 Dive attack by Mirage 2000 after scouting of ground targets by Jaguar and IAI Herons
 Mig-21 Bison attacking ground target with 64 mm Rockets
 Su-30MKI dropping 1000 lb Guided bomb (Aborted)
 Mig-27 firing 40 mm  Rockets on ground targets
 Su-30MKI firing runway penetrating bombs
 Jaguar demonstrating precision bombing
 Su-30MKI firing precision guided bombs
 Jaguar firing 3 x 1000 lb bombs
 HAL Tejas demonstrating swing role capability: an LGB on ground target quickly followed by an R-73 launch to shoot down a simulated interceptor
 Phase-3: Defensive Operations
 MANPADS firing
 Garud Commandos carrying out a Search & Rescue mission from a Mi-17 escorted by Mi-35.
 OSA AK-M Surface to air firing
 Mi-35 firing 80 mm Rockets on ground targets
 BAe Hawk trainer aircraft two 125 kg bombs followed by 68 mm rockets
 MiG-21 fire S-24 (240 mm caliber) heavy rockets
 Su-30MKI fire 26 x 250 kg bombs demonstrating carpet bombing
 2 C-130J deploy 60 paratroopers
 Mi-17 demonstrating quick slithering operation
 Mi-17 demonstrating deploying of a Fast Attack Vehicle with 5 Guards who conduct a surgical strike and return to the Mi-17 for quick escape
 IL-76 dropping heavy cargo with parachutes escorted by 2 Mig-29 who intercept and fire R-73 missile at an interceptor
 C-130J demonstrates an assault landing on a short field deploys 26 commandos and quickly takes off in about 1000 feet and flies away with complex maneuvering
 Mi-17 demonstrate fire control using slithered buckets
 Flying displays:
After these live weapons demonstrations, several aerobatics display and other events continued before commencing of Phase 4: Night Operations.
 HAL Dhruv Sarang helicopter display team aerobatics
 Su-30MKI aerobatics
 Akash Ganga sky diving team deployed from an An-32
 Simulation of the Operation Black Tornado by the NSG from a Mi-17
 IAI Heron (remote-piloted aircraft, RPA) demonstration
 Rifle drill by the Air Force
 Musical performance by IAF bands
 Handing mementos to various dignitaries in presence
 Phase-4: Night operations
Targets were briefed before the firing commenced. All aircraft fired flares before deploying targets to enhance visibility. Following operations were carried out:
 An-32 modified to deploy weapons 10 x 1000 lb carpet bombing demonstration
 MiG-27UP firing S-24 heavy rockets
 Mirage-2000 firing dumb bombs
 MiG-27UP firing S-24 heavy rockets
 Jaguar firing 3 × 1000 lb bombs from 500 feet altitude
 Jaguar firing 4 × 1000 lb bombs in dive
 Su-30MKI firing 18 × 250 kg bombs (Aborted)
 Jaguar 4 × 1000 lb bombs
 Mi-17 Night Slither operation to drop Garud commandos under search light
 Pechora SAM-3 ripple firing to an airborne target at 10 km range
 Mi-35 firing S-24 heavy rockets fired with assistance of newly included NVG & FLIR avionics
 IL-78MKI firing 300 flares to announce end of Iron Fist 2013
 An-32 firing 50 flares

List of Aircraft participating
Fighter Aircraft
 Sukhoi Su-30MKI
 Mikoyan MiG-29 "Baaz"
 Dassault Mirage 2000 "Vajra"
 Mikoyan-Gurevich MiG-21
 Mikoyan-Gurevich MiG-27 "Bahadur"
 SEPECAT Jaguar "Shamsher"
 HAL LCA "Tejas"
Transport Aircraft
 Ilyushin Il-76 Candid "Gajraaj"
 C-130J Super Hercules
 Antonov An-32 Cline
 DRDO EMB-145 AEWCS
Trainer Aircraft
 BAE Hawk
 Pilatus PC-7
Rotary Wing Aircraft
 HAL Rudra
 HAL Light Combat Helicopter
 Mil Mi-35 Hind-E
 Mil Mi-8
 Mi-17
 HAL Dhruv
 HAL Cheetah
 HAL Chetak
UAV
 IAI Heron

Weapon systems
IGLA
Osa-AKM
Pechora

Special Forces
NSG Commandos
Garud Commandos
Akash Ganga Sky Diving team

Iron Fist 2016
Iron Fist 2016 was held on 18 March 2016. It featured the participation of 181 aircraft, 103 of them fighter planes. It also included a display of the firepower of Tejas LCA for the first time.

Highlights
22 types of platforms, weapons systems.   
The firing of Akash missile.
HAL LCH firing 70 mm rockets.
Astra missile live firing

References

External links

IAF's first day-night exercise 'Iron Fist' begins in Rajasthan - DNA

Indian Air Force
Indian military exercises
Military exercises and wargames